Cerberilla is a genus of sea slugs, aeolid nudibranchs, shell-less marine gastropod mollusks in the family Aeolidiidae.

All Cerberilla species have a broad foot and the cerata are numerous, arranged in transverse rows across the body. They live on and in sandy substrates where they burrow beneath the surface and feed on burrowing sea anemones.

The taxonomic status of this genus remains unrevised.

Species
Species in the genus Cerberilla include:
 Cerberilla affinis Bergh, 1888
 Cerberilla africana Eliot, 1903
 Cerberilla albopunctata Baba, 1976
 Cerberilla ambonensis Bergh, 1905
 Cerberilla annulata (Quoy & Gaimard, 1832)
 Cerberilla asamusiensis Baba, 1940
 Cerberilla bernadettae Tardy, 1965
 Cerberilla chavezi Hermosillo & Valdés, 2007
 Cerberilla incola Burn, 1974
 Cerberilla longibranchus (Volodchenko, 1941)
 Cerberilla longicirrha Bergh, 1873 - Type species
 Cerberilla moebii (Bergh, 1888)
 Cerberilla mosslandica McDonald & Nybakken, 1975
 Cerberilla potiguara Padula & Delgado, 2010
 Cerberilla pungoarena Collier & Farmer, 1964
 Cerberilla tanna Ev. Marcus & Er. Marcus, 1960
Species brought into synonymy
 Cerberilla bernadetti Tardy, 1965: synonym of Cerberilla bernadettae Tardy, 1965

References

Aeolidiidae